Tight junction protein ZO-2 is a protein that in humans is encoded by the TJP2 gene.

Tight junction proteins (TJPs) belong to a family of membrane-associated guanylate kinase (MAGUK) homologs that are involved in the organization of epithelial and endothelial intercellular junctions. TJPs bind to the cytoplasmic C termini of junctional transmembrane proteins and link them to the actin cytoskeleton [supplied by OMIM].

Interactions
Tight junction protein 2 has been shown to interact with tight junction protein 1, band 4.1, occludin and USP53.

References

Further reading